Durant High School is a public high school in Plant City, Florida. The school is named for the community in which it is located and opened in 1995. The school's first Principal, Ron Frost died of cancer in 1997. The Durant High School Football stadium is named in his honor. Principals have included Ron Frost (1995-1997), Sherry Sikes (1997-1999), Joe Perez (1999–2004), Pamela Bowden (2004–2019) and Gary Graham (2019-present).

The school mascot is the cougar and the school newspaper is The PawPrint, which is part of the High School National Ad Network.

Graduation Rate

In 2012 Durant's graduation rate was 86% as compared to a statewide rate of 74.5% and a Hillsborough County rate of 72.6% npr

State of Florida School Grades

2016 C
2012 A
2011 B
2010 B
2009 B
2008 B npr

Notable alumni
Brooke Bennett – Olympic gold medalist
Lisa Casalino - American jazz singer and songwriter
Tyler Danish - Major League Baseball pitcher
Adrienne Gang - Below Deck Bravo TV personality
Ryan Raburn – Former MLB outfielder
 Ean Randolph - American and Canadian football wide receiver.
Jaclyn Raulerson - Miss Florida 2010
Jeremy Rosado - American singer
Justin Lee Stanley - Filmmaker (Director of Evil Lives Here) 
Alicia Tirelli - American-born Puerto Rican retired footballer
Trae Williams – pro football player

References

External links
Durant High School
Durant Drama & Theatre Department
Durant Band & Orchestra

1995 establishments in Florida
Educational institutions established in 1995
High schools in Hillsborough County, Florida
Public high schools in Florida
Plant City, Florida